Lussivolutopsius emphaticus is a species of sea snail, a marine gastropod mollusc in the family Buccinidae, the true whelks.

References

External links

Buccinidae